Sawyers Bar Catholic Church (St. Joseph's Catholic Church) is a historic church building in the Klamath National Forest in Sawyers Bar, California, within the Roman Catholic Diocese of Sacramento.

The church was built in 1855 under the direction of Father Florian Schwenninger, a Benedictine monk, who had come to the area of the Salmon River to serve the needs of the Catholic population among the local miners.  The first Mass was celebrated in 1857.  The site also contains a graveyard with graves dating to as early as 1850.  The Church was added to the National Register of Historic Places in 1978.  Today, the church is considered a mission church of Sacred Heart Parish in Fort Jones, CA.

References

Roman Catholic Diocese of Sacramento
Roman Catholic churches in California
Churches on the National Register of Historic Places in California
Roman Catholic churches completed in 1855
Buildings and structures in Siskiyou County, California
Klamath National Forest
Rustic architecture in California
National Register of Historic Places in Siskiyou County, California
19th-century Roman Catholic church buildings in the United States